Sam Dale Lake State Fish and Wildlife Area is an Illinois state park on  in Wayne County, Illinois, United States.

References

State parks of Illinois
Protected areas of Wayne County, Illinois
Reservoirs in Illinois
Protected areas established in 1959
Landforms of Wayne County, Illinois
1959 establishments in Illinois